Hillsong Music is Christian music produced by Hillsong Church in Sydney, Australia as well as offshoot churches, Hillsong London, and Hillsong Kiev. Hillsong albums are released and distributed by Hillsong Music.  The main groups are Hillsong Worship, Hillsong United, Hillsong Young & Free, and Hillsong Kids.

History 

Hillsong Church's popularity in Christian praise and worship music stems from the inauguration of the Hillsong Conference in 1986 and the first publication of choruses written by Hills CLC members, especially Darlene Zschech. It is in this context that Hillsong Music was founded in 1991. Their first live worship CD The Power of Your Love was released in 1992. Since then, live praise and worship albums have been produced each year. Other music series include the Worship series, United, Youth Alive, Hillsong Kids and Instrumental series. They have also released two Christmas albums and several compilation albums. "What a Beautiful Name" won the  2018 Grammy Award for Best Contemporary Christian Music Performance/Song.

Popularity 

Some Hillsong songs have distinct gospel influences. Hillsong Music titles regularly feature in the top 25 of most songs sung in all reporting countries recorded through the CCLI website.  Christian Copyright Licensing International allows churches to use any listed music through a flat fee based on congregational size rather than buying access to individual songs, making recent music more affordable to churches all over the world.

People Just Like Us was the first Christian album to achieve gold status in Australia as well as the first to go Platinum. To date, all Hillsong live worship albums have achieved Gold status in Australia. In 1996, Hillsong Music reached international prominence with the release of Shout to the Lord produced by Integrity Music. This was Integrity Music's first live worship album featuring a female worship leader – Darlene Zschech.

The 2004 Hillsong live worship album For All You've Done, debuted at No. 1 on the Australian Record Industry Association album charts.  There was some controversy about this outcome as almost all of the albums were sold at Hillsong's annual conference held in early July. The Australian Recording Industry Association (ARIA) have defended the outcome noting that the album sold more copies than any other record on sale in Australia that week.
As of December 2011, Hillsong has sold more than 12 million records across the globe, following its first release in 1991
and a quarter of all contemporary songs heard in Australian churches in 2011 were written by Hillsong.

Albums 

Early albums were released solely on cassette and CD. Video recordings of the live albums have also been made for VHS since the second album in 1993, and additionally for DVD since 2000, with increasing additional content such as documentaries and extra songs.  The Hillsong United series CDs have included an additional free part-length DVD since 2004. Several music books have also been published. Including all the series (LIVE, UNITED, Kids, Kids Junior, Chapel, Young & Free, Español, Youth Term, Youth Alive, Worship, Compilation, Instrumental, Christmas, Preview, KIEV, LONDON) and other special releases (Like The 1st Album, Or Other special recordings) they have more than 125 albums, in 15 series.

Hillsong Worship (formerly known as Hillsong Live) 

 Show Your Glory (1990)
 The Power of Your Love (1992)
 Stone's Been Rolled Away (1993)
 People Just Like Us (1994)
 Friends in High Places (1995)
 God Is in the House (1996)
 All Things Are Possible (1997)
 Touching Heaven Changing Earth (1998)
 By Your Side (1999)
 For This Cause (2000)
 You Are My World (2001)
 Blessed (2002)
 Hope (2003)
 For All You've Done (2004)
 God He Reigns (2005)
 Mighty to Save (2006)
 Saviour King (2007)
 This Is Our God  (2008)
 Faith + Hope + Love  (2009)
 A Beautiful Exchange  (2010)
 God is Able   (2011)
 Cornerstone (2012)
 Glorious Ruins (2013)
 No Other Name (2014)
 Open Heaven / River Wild (2015)
 Let There Be Light  (2016)
 The Peace Project (2017)
 There Is More  (2018)
 Awake  (2019)
 Take Heart (Again) (2020)
 These Same Skies (2021)
 Team Night (2022)

Hillsong United 

 Everyday (1999)
 Best Friend (2000)
 King of Majesty (2001)
 To the Ends of the Earth (2002)
 More Than Life (2004)
 Look to You (2005)
 United We Stand (2006)
 Unidos Permanecemos  (2007)
 All of the Above (2007)
 In a Valley by the Sea(EP) (2007)
 The I Heart Revolution. Part I: With Hearts as One (2008)
 Across the Earth (2009)
 Aftermath (2011)
 Live in Miami (2012)
 Zion (2013)
 Oceans (EP) (2013)
 Zion Acoustic Sessions (2013)
 The White Album (Remix Project) (2014)
 Empires (2015)
 Of Dirt and Grace: Live from the Land (2016)
 Wonder (2017)
 People (2019)
 People En Español (2019)
 The People Tour: Live from Madison Square Garden (2021)
 Are We There Yet? (2022)

Hillsong Chapel 

 Yahweh (2010)
 Forever Reign (2012)

Hillsong Young & Free 

 We Are Young & Free (2013)
 This Is Living (EP) (2014)
 The Remixes (EP) (2015)
 Youth Revival (2016)
 Youth Revival (acoustic) (2017)
 III (2018)
 III (Live at Hillsong Conference) (2018)
 III (Studio Sessions) (2019)
 III (Reimagined) (2019)
 All of My Best Friends (2020)
 Out Here On A Friday Where It Began (2021)
 Out Here On A Friday (Acoustic) (2022)

Special singles 

 It Is Well with My Soul (Worship)
 Vivo Estás (Young & Free)
 The Stand (Young & Free)
 Océanos (Donde Mis Pies Pueden Fallar) (UNITED)
 Noel (Young & Free)
 Peace Has Come (Worship)
 Vida Tú Me Das (Young & Free)

Hillsong Kids 

 Jesus Is My Superhero (15 November 2004)
 Super Strong God (1 November 2005)
 Supernatural (1 December 2006)
 Tell the World (8 December 2007)
 Follow You (6 December 2008)
 Ultimate Kids Collection (2009)
 Can You Believe It!? (21 September 2018)

Hillsong Kids Junior 

 Crazy Noise (2011)

Worship series 

 Simply Worship (1996)
 Simply Worship 2 (1997)
 Simply Worship 3 (1998)
 Overwhelmed (2000)
 Amazing Love (2002)
 Faithful (2003)
 Songs for Communion (2006)

Instrumental worship 

 The Secret Place (1999)
 Forever (2003)

Christmas 

 Christmas (2001)
 Celebrating Christmas (2005)
 Born Is The King (2011)
 We Have a Saviour  (2012)
 The Peace Project  (2017)

Compilation 

 Hills Praise (1997)
 Extravagant Worship: The Songs of Darlene Zschech (2002)
 Extravagant Worship: The Songs of Reuben Morgan (2002)
 The Platinum Collection Volume 1: Shout to the Lord (2000)
 The Platinum Collection Volume 2: Shout to the Lord 2 (2003)
 Ultimate Worship (2005)
 Ultimate Collection Volume II (2008)
 The Very Best of Hillsong LIVE (2010)
 Ultimate Kids Collection (2009)

 Special edition that includes a special release of 'Look To You', 'United We Stand' and 'All of the Above'.

Other 

 Shout to the Lord (1996)
 Shout to the Lord Special: Gold Edition (1996)
 I Believe the Promise (1997)
 Shout to the Lord 2000 (1998)
 Hillsong" + Delirious? – UP: Unified Praise (2004)
 Hillsong Kiev; Sydney; London – Господь всего (Lord of All) (2007)
 God is Able EP (2012)
 Cornerstone EP (2012)
 Hillsong Global Project (2012)
 Shout to the Lord 2   (2015)
 Hillsong: Let Hope Rise - Original Motion Picture Soundtrack (2016)

Spanish 

 Unidos Permanecemos  (2006)
 Con Todo  (2010)
 En Mi Lugar  (2011)
 Global Project Español  (2012)
 En Esto  (2015)
 Ruido Alegre (2016)
 El Eco De Su Voz (2017)
 Hay Más (2019)
 People En Español (2019)

Portuguese 

 Global Project Português (2012)
 Quão Lindo Esse Nome (2018)
 Quem Dizes Que Eu Sou (2019)

Hillsong London 

 Shout God's Fame (2004)
 Jesus Is (2006)
 Jesus Is: Remix (2007)
 Hail to the King (2008)

Hillsong Kiev 

 Пламя (Flame) (1995) - Studio worship
 Мы будем славить (We Will Praise) (1997) – Live praise & worship
 Это знает душа моя (That My Soul Knows) (1997) – Live praise & worship
 Прыгай в небеса (Jump Up into Heaven) (1998) – Youth studio worship
 С Богом возможно всё (All Things Are Possible with God) (1998) – Live praise & worship
 План  (Plan) (1999) – Youth live worship
 Небеса на земле (Heaven on Earth) (2000) – Live praise & worship
 Лучший Друг (Best Friend) (2001) – Live praise & worship
 Революция  (Revolution) (2001) – Youth live worship
 Царь Величия (King of Majesty) (2002) – Live praise & worship
 Пожар (Burn) (2004) – Youth live worship
 Слава в вышних (Glory in the Highest) (2005) – Live praise & worship
 Иисус мой Супергерой (Jesus Is My Superhero) (2005) – Kids series
 Это мой дом (This Is My Home) (2006) – Live praise & worship
 Спасение (Salvation) (2006) – Youth live worship
 Суперcильный Бог (Super Strong God) (2006) – Kids series
 Сверхъестественный Бог (Supernatural God) (2007) – Kids series
 Господь всего (Lord of All) (2007) – Live praise & worship
 Алтарь (Altar) (2008) – Live praise & worship
 Это наш Царь (This is our King) (2009) – Live praise & worship
 Бог Есть Любовь (God Is Love) (2010) – Live praise & worship
 Неразделимы (Undivided) (2010) – Youth live worship
 Всего мира свет (Light of the world) (2010) – Kids series
 Ритм благодати (Rhythms of Grace) (2012) – Youth worship
 Океаны (Oceans) (2014) - Live praise & worship
 Нет Другого Имени (No Other Name) (2014) - EP
 Открытые Небеса / Живая Вода (Open Heaven / River Wild) (2017) - EP
 Да Будет Свет  (Let There Be Light) (2017) - EP
 Я Знаю Кто Я В Тебе (I Know Who I Am In You) (2019) - Studio worship

Kiev Christmas 

 Christmas Carols EP (Роман Касевич) (2009) - Studio Christmas worship

Kiev compilations 

 Платиновый Коллекция: Иисус мой Спаситель (Platinum Collection Volume: Jesus My Saviour) (2004) - Compilation praise & worship
 Окончательный коллекция (Ultimate Collection) (2010) - Compilation Kids series

Music videos

See also

References

External links 
 
 Hillsong Music Ukraine website

Australian record labels
Evangelical Christian record labels
Music
Contemporary worship music
Record labels based in Sydney